Bolívar Municipality is one of the 12 municipalities (municipios) that makes up the Venezuelan state of Barinas and, according to a 2007 population estimate by the National Institute of Statistics of Venezuela, the municipality has a population of 47,878.  The town of Barinitas is the shire town of the Bolívar Municipality.

Name
The municipality is one of several in Venezuela named "Bolívar Municipality" in honour of Venezuelan independence hero Simón Bolívar.

Demographics
The Bolívar Municipality, according to a 2007 population estimate by the National Institute of Statistics of Venezuela, has a population of 47,878 (up from 40,863 in 2000). This amounts to 6.3% of the state's population.

Government
The mayor of the Bolívar Municipality is Iván Dario Maldonado, elected on October 31, 2004, with 49% of the vote.  He replaced Alberto Melean shortly after the elections.  The municipality is divided into three parishes; Barinitas, Altamira, and Calderas.

References

External links

Municipalities of Barinas (state)